Asadi may refer to:

People
 Ali Akbar Ostad-Asadi, Iranian footballer
 Ebrahim Asadi, Iranian footballer
 Houshang Asadi, Iranian journalist
 Mohammed al-Asadi, Yemeni extrajudicial prisoner of the United States
 Morteza Asadi, Iranian footballer

Places
 Asadi, Iran, village in Qazvin Province, Iran
 Asadi al-Faya, village in eastern Yemen

Iranian-language surnames